A riding hall, indoor arena,   indoor school (UK English), or indoor ring (US English) is a building (part of an equestrian facility) that is specially designed for indoor horse riding.  Smaller, private buildings contain only space for riding, while larger commercial facilities contain a "ring" or "arena" within a larger building as exclusively for equestrian use, but may also incorporate additional facilities for spectators or stabling of horses.

An outdoor enclosure for riding horses is called a riding arena, (training) ring (US English), or (outdoor) school (British English) or, sometimes, a manège (British English). In other languages, the French word manège, or a derivative, means "riding hall" since, in French, the word refers to an indoor hall, while an outdoor arena is called a carrière.

Building design 

Riding halls enable horses and riders to train or compete in dry conditions regardless of the weather. There are various designs. The most popular are either steel-girder or timber-framed buildings, with wood, brick or sheet-metal panels.
Roofs can be made of various materials including sandwich panels, corrugated steel, or in smaller buildings, wood. In some cases, stables are built either nearby or attached to a riding hall, sometimes under the same roof.  In addition, tension fabric buildings are also used as arenas. These textile buildings usually consist of an aluminium frame and a high-strength PVC-covered sheet roof as well as wind protection or windbreak(er) netting in the walls.

Construction 

Riding halls are built with the following criteria in mind:

 The arena must be as large as possible for the purposes intended.  Commercial arenas may be smaller than private facilities.  Smaller halls may provide an advantage for certain disciplines.
 There should be no support columns in the arena; obstacles such as jumps are generally moveable, dressage pillars may be an exception
 The hall must have high, wide doors that are easy to open.
 The hall should be illuminated as much as possible by daylight, preferably from above via skylights or similar design elements.

Government approval, building permits, or other official permissions are often required to build riding halls.  Buildings intended for commercial or public uses may also have stands  or other seating included with the structure.  Facilities such as toilets or concessions may be included in a commercial facility.

Functional design 
Riding halls are usually not heated because this is healthier for the horses. Commercial arenas may be significant larger.

Of great importance is the footing quality. Floors often consist of a top layer of 100mm of silica sand over a complex aggregate substrate designed to ensure proper drainage. A good riding surface needs to have the right level of moisture content to reduce the amount of dust, aid maintenance and ensure good rideability. This may be achieved by an automatic floor watering facility – whereby the floor is watered from sprinklers above it, by regular watering with hoses and ground-based sprinklers or by underground irrigation using e.g. ebb and flow riding surface systems.

Lighting is also particularly important. The sensitivity of horses to dark and light makes it essential to have consistent lighting. Skylights are common.  Artificial light need to be diffused and non-dazzling and brightness needs to be adjustable depending on the riding discipline being performed.

Special purpose halls 

A lungeing hall is a smaller hall for lungeing horses. Most lungeing halls are circular and have a diameter of 16–24 metres. Rectangular designs may be cheaper to build and give horses a better spatial orientation. Lungeing halls also generally needs building permission.

Famous riding halls 

 Spanish Riding School, Vienna
 Salle du Manège, Paris
 Moscow Manege and Saint Petersburg Manege in Russia
 Belém Riding Hall, Lisbon

See also 
Arena
Hall
Round pen

Notes

References

Further reading 
 Wolfgang Götz: Deutsche Marställe des Barock. Munich, 1964.
 Liliane Skalecki: Das Reithaus. Untersuchungen zu einer Bauaufgabe im 17. bis 19. Jahrhundert. Olms, Hildesheim, 1992 (Studien zur Kunstgeschichte, 76), .
 Gerlinde Hoffmann / Deutsche Reiterliche Vereinigung (FN): Orientierungshilfen zum Reitanlagen- und Stallbau, (p. 116 Longierhalle), Warendorf, 2009, 
 Helmbrecht Boege: Konstruktion von Gebäudehüllen für die Pferdehaltung, in Baubriefe Landwirtschaft Nr. 49 - Pferdehaltung, Deutsche Landwirtschaftsverlag, Hanover, pp. 88ff

External links 

Rooms
Sports venues by type
Equestrianism